Mercedes Sandoval de Hempel (February 8, 1919 – February 7, 2005) was a Paraguayan lawyer and feminist. In 1992, the amendment of the Paraguayan Civil Code finally recognized equality between men and women. The wording of Article 1 of Law 704/61 was simple: “” (It is hereby recognized that women have the same political rights and obligations as men.)

Career 
A graduate from the Faculty of Law at the Universidad Nacional de Asunción, she specialized in labor and civil law and then in family law, women and minors.
Sandoval founded the Paraguayan League for the Rights of Women and the Paraguayan Association of University Graduates, serving as chair of both organizations. CLADEM (Comité de América Latina y El Caribe para la Defensa de los Derechos de la Mujer; Committee for Latin America and the Caribbean for the Defense of Women's Rights) Paraguay nominated Sandoval as a candidate for the "1000 Women for the Nobel Peace Prize 2005" as a part of the PeaceWomen Across the Globe initiative.

Sandoval was married, but the couple separated after eighteen years. They had one child, Anna Mercedes Hempel Sandoval, who became a teacher. Sandoval suffered a stroke and was confined to a wheelchair before her death in Asunción in 2005.

Honors
Distinction of the Inter-American Commission of Women (CIM-OAS)
Soroptimist International Club recognition, the Guairá Lawyers Forum of the Association of Secretaries of Paraguay and Lions Club
Candidate 1000 Mujeres para el Premio Nobel 2005, nominated by the Committee for Latin America and the Caribbean for the Defense of the Rights of Women (2005)
Parliament distinction, postmortem, Congressional of Women Paraguay (2012)

Selected works
 Anteproyecto de Ley de Reforma Parcial del Código Civil (1989)
 El derecho de la familia en el Paraguay: estudio realizado en el Centro Paraguayo de Estudios de Población para el Grupo Parlamentario Interamericano sobre Población y Desarrollo (with Nelly Obregón de González & Alicia Pucheta de Correa; 1986)

References

Bibliography

1919 births
2005 deaths
20th-century Paraguayan lawyers
Paraguayan women's rights activists
Paraguayan feminists
People from Asunción
Universidad Nacional de Asunción alumni
Paraguayan women writers
Paraguayan women lawyers
20th-century Paraguayan women writers
20th-century Paraguayan writers
20th-century women lawyers